The Mulligan River is a tributary of Eyre Creek in the Channel Country region of southwest Queensland. It is in the Lake Eyre Basin. The river rises in Glenormiston Station and flows generally south through Marion Downs Station into Eyre Creek, which ultimately feeds through the Warburton River into Lake Eyre.

References

Rivers of Queensland